The 1952 United States men's Olympic basketball team competed in the 1952 Summer Olympics in Helsinki, Finland from July 14 to August 2, 1952. Warren Womble was the team's head coach, and Phog Allen was the team's main assistant coach. The team won its third straight Summer Olympics basketball gold medal.

Roster
The team consisted of 14 members. It included five members of the Amateur Athletic Union's Peoria Caterpillars team and two Phillips 66ers. The team also featured seven players from the National Champion 1951–52 Kansas Jayhawks men's basketball team, as well as their coach Phog Allen, who served as assistant on the team.

1952 Team USA match ups

Final match up versus USSR

The final match up game was a very low scoring game. After only ten minutes, Team USA led 4–3. After USSR took a lead in the third quarter, Team USA began to display their offense by shooting well. Team USA won the game by 11 points. Lovellette scored nine points, while Kurland scored eight points.

Final standings

1.  (8–0)
2.  (6–2)
3.  (5–3)
4.  (5–3)
5.  (4–4)
6.  (4–4)
7.  (4–4)
8.  (4–4)
9.  (3–3)
10.  (1–4)
11.  (1–2)
12.  (3–3)
13.  (0–3)
14.  (2–4)
15.  (1–2)
16.  (1–2)

See also
Basketball at the 1952 Summer Olympics

References

External links
 USA Basketball, official site

United States at the Olympic men's basketball tournament
United States
olympic